New Covenant Academy (NCA) is a private Christian school for pre-Kindergarten to 12th grade. It is located in Mansfield, Pennsylvania at 310 Extension Street, Mansfield, PA 16933. Kjell Fenn is the principal.

The school was established in 1979, originally located in the building of the East West Karate school in downtown Mansfield. Its first headmaster was Brian Barden. The mission is "to provide Christ-centered academic excellence."

Academics 
New Covenant Academy offers education Pre-K through 12th grade. These classes are split into 3 main categories: elementary, middle school, and high school. Elementary includes grades Pre-K through 5th grade. Middle school includes 6th and 7th; high school includes grades 8th through 12th.

New Covenant Academy has an Extended Learning Center (ELC) for students who need extra help. The ELC is designed to be an extension of a child's regular classroom. NCA has core subjects such as history, science, math, bible, and English classes. Students also take art, music, and P.E. and in high school they also take Spanish (levels I, II, and III in high school) and computers.  The high school is run on a 8-period schedule. 1st through 5th periods are before lunch, while the remaining two are after lunch. This schedule is held throughout the 5-day week. Chapels, in which guest speakers provide an encouraging Christian message, are Mondays. NCA has many electives including STEM, drama, home economics, yearbook, and cooking.

Athletics 
New Covenant Academy has offered a variety of sports. Current sports include soccer, basketball, volleyball, and track and field.

In order to participate in athletics students must have a grade point average of at least 70% and cannot have a failing grade. If a student-athlete has a grade below 70, he/she will be ineligible to play that sport until their grades improve.

Clubs and activities
Clubs and extracurricular activities vary from year to year; permanent ones include worship team, student council, and yearbook.

References

Schools in Tioga County, Pennsylvania
Christian schools in Pennsylvania
Private elementary schools in Pennsylvania
Private middle schools in Pennsylvania
Private high schools in Pennsylvania
Educational institutions established in 1979
1979 establishments in Pennsylvania